The 1876 Kansas gubernatorial election was held on November 7, 1876. Republican nominee George T. Anthony defeated Democratic nominee John Martin with 56.78% of the vote.

General election

Candidates
Major party candidates 
George T. Anthony, Republican
John Martin, Democratic

Other candidates
J. Hudson, Independent

Results

References

1876
Kansas
Gubernatorial